Craniofacial dysostosis-diaphyseal hyperplasia syndrome is a rare genetic disorder characterized by craniofacial dysostosis, small cranium with accompanying thin skullbone, generalized depressions on the frontoparietal and occipitoparietal sutures, underdevelopment of the chin, exophthalmos, long bone cortical sclerosis (bending and shortening), and puberty-onset progressive bone cortex thickening. It is inherited following an autosomal dominant inheritance pattern. Around 14 cases from 3 families worldwide have been described in medical literature (although the number might be higher since one of the families described with the disorder supposedly had other members who had the same syndrome but weren't physically examined by researchers).

References 

Congenital disorders of musculoskeletal system
Rare genetic syndromes
Autosomal dominant disorders